The 2010 South American Women's Football Championship squads consisted of 20 players (2 goalkeepers and 18 outfield players) per team.

Group A

Argentina
Head coach: Carlos Borrello.

Bolivia
Head coach: Napoleón Cardozo.

Chile
Head coach:  Marta Tejedor

The final 20-player squad was announced on 20 October 2010.

Ecuador
Head coach: Juan Carlos Cerón.

Peru
Head coach: Jaime Duarte.

Group B

Brazil
Head coach: Kleiton Lima.

Colombia
Head coach: Ricardo Rozo

Paraguay
Head coach: Nelson Basualdo.

Uruguay
Head coach: Jorge Burgell.

Venezuela
Head coach: ?

References

2010 South American Women's Football Championship
2010